Old House may refer to:

Places
Old House, a building in the village of Sankt Anton am Arlberg, Tyrol, Austria
The Old House, a house in the parish of Lydbrook, Gloucestershire, England, UK
The Old House, Harrietsham, a well-preserved former farmhouse
Old House, Hereford, a house, now a museum, in Hereford, England, UK
The Old House, Ightham Common, a pub in Kent, England, UK
Old House (Quincy, Massachusetts) or Peacefield, a historic home of President Adams in Massachusetts, USA
Old House (Cutchogue), a National Historic Landmark house in Suffolk County, New York, USA
Old House, Pirot, Serbia, former house of the Hristić family
Old House, South Carolina, a community in Jasper County, SC

Other uses
The Old House (fairy tale), an 1847 fairy tale by Hans Christian Andersen
"Old House", a song by Nik Kershaw from You've Got to Laugh

See also
 This Old House